Sundstrand is a surname. Notable people with the surname include:

 Anna Sundstrand (born 1989), Swedish singer
 David Sundstrand (1880–1930), American inventor

See also
 Hamilton Sundstrand, American aerospace corporation 
 Sundstrand Corporation, American tool manufacturer

Swedish-language surnames